The Men's 1500 metre freestyle competition at the 2017 Summer Universiade was held on 21 and 22 August 2017.

Records
Prior to the competition, the existing world and Universiade records were as follows.

The following new records were set during this competition.

Results

Heats 
The heats were held on 21 August at 10:13.

Final 
The final was held on 22 August at 19:02.

References

Men's 1500 metre freestyle